Zareen Khan (born 14 May 1987), also known as Zarine Khan, is an Indian actress and model. Mainly working in the Hindi film industry, she has also appeared in Punjabi, Telugu and Tamil films.

Khan made her Bollywood debut in 2010 playing a princess in the epic action film Veer and subsequently appeared in the popular item number "Character Dheela" in the 2011 comedy Ready. She got her breakthrough with the role of a glamorous model in the 2012 comedy Housefull 2, that ranks as her highest-grossing release till date. The next year, she ventured into Tamil cinema with an item number Malgove in Naan Rajavaga Pogiren. Following a leading role in the 2014 Punjabi film Jatt James Bond, she returned to Bollywood, starring in the 2015 erotic thriller Hate Story 3. In 2019, Khan debuted into Telugu cinema with the action thriller Chanakya.

Early life
Zareen Khan was born on 14 May 1987 in Mumbai, India, into a Pathan family. She completed her intermediate at Rizvi College of Science, Mumbai.

Career

2010–2011: Film debut and early work 

Khan's acting career began while visiting the set of Yuvraj at Subhash Ghai's film school Whistling Woods. Salman Khan noticed her and decided to cast her for his friend Anil Sharma's film Veer because, he said, "She looks the character – the sweet princess she is playing in Veer". After a screen test, Khan was given the lead role of Princess Yashodhara. She gained eight kilograms in order to be more convincing as a 19th-century princess.  The film revolves around the 1825 Pindari movement of Rajasthan, when India was ruled by the British. Veer did not do well at the box office; however, her performance received mixed reviews from both critics and audiences. Taran Adarsh of Bollywood Hungama observed that "Zarine resembles Katrina Kaif, but wears one expression all through". Nikhat Kazmi of Times of India concluded that "Zarine is unimpressive". Rediff.com mentions that "Zarine is average". Critic Subhash K. Jha called her performance a "Zarine's charm adds to her adorable screen presence." Khan was nominated for the Zee Cine Award for Best Female Debut for her performance in the film.

In 2011, Khan did the item number "Character Dheela" with Salman Khan in Anees Bazmee's Ready, parodying characters from Mughal-e-Azam, Sholay and Shri 420 and it was the second highest-grossing Bollywood film of 2011.

2012–2013: Breakthrough

Khan walked the ramp as showstopper for jewellery brand YS18 at India International Jewellery Week (IIJW), 2012.

Khan's second release was Sajid Khan's comedy film Housefull 2, a sequel of Housefull and Hindi remake of the Malayalam film Mattupetti Machan. The film revolves around two cousins Henna and Bobby, the two daughters of the Kapoor family who hate each other very much, a model JLo, love interest of Jolly, the son of Jagga Daku and four Best friends Sunny, Max, Jolly, and Jai who fall in love with her. Khan played the role of JLo, a model who is in love with Jolly, played by Ritesh Deshmukh and featured her alongside an ensemble cast including Akshay Kumar, Asin, John Abraham and Jacqueline Fernandez. Khan earned critical acclaim for her performance, with Taran Adarsh stating, "Zarine act more as eye candy. She appears typical sultry and enticing selves; and is befitting in her own space." Housefull 2 ranked among the highest-grossing Bollywood films of 2012.

In 2013, Khan made her Tamil debut in Vetrimaaran's Naan Rajavaga Pogiren, in which she did an item number in the song "Malgove" alongside Nakul Jaidev. She was appreciated for the song. Taran Adarsh commented, "Zarine Khan's song is high on energy."

2014–present: Shift to leading roles

Khan's first release of 2014 was Rohit Jugraj's Punjabi film Jatt James Bond, her first role outside Bollywood. She featured in the role of a Lalli, an innocent Punjabi woman alongside Gippy Grewal. The film received positive reviews from critics, and her performance was particularly praised. Film critic Komal Nahta wrote "Zarine Khan delivers an award-winning performance. She is extraordinary and lives the role of Lalli, making every scene in which she appears immensely watchable for her brilliance!"

In 2015, Khan appeared in erotic thriller film Hate Story 3, in which she played Siya. The film was a commercial success and got Khan further recognition. She then appeared in a music video "Pyaar Manga Hai" with Ali Fazal. The song was sung by Armaan Malik and Neeti Mohan. In 2016, Khan did an item number in the film Veerappan. The same year, she also appeared in another item song named "Mahi Ve" in the film Wajah Tum Ho.

In 2017, Khan appeared in Aksar 2. In the film, she was seen romancing with Gautam Rode, and the first poster of the film was released on 4 August 2017 on YouTube. Umesh Punwani from Koimoi.com wrote, ''Zareen Khan does good in parts but sadly she is majorly used for the skin show. Years into Bollywood she still can’t emote her expressions properly.'' Bollywood Hungama disliked Khan's performance and wrote, ''Zareen Khan is strictly okay and though she is sizzling, it's done just for the heck of it. She tries to be the female Emraan Hashmi but it doesn't work for her. Performance-wise, she doesn't give her best shot.'' The film did not perform well at the box office.

In 2018, Khan starred in Vikram Bhatt's horror film 1921, the fourth installment in 1920 film series. Shikta Sanyal of Koimoi.com called it ''Khan’s best performance till date.'' Although the film received mixed reviews, it managed to recover its cost and became an ''average grosser.'' In January 2018, Khan signed Ashok Nanda's action film One Day: Justice Delivered, in which she was set to portray the role of a police officer. She was eventually replaced by Esha Gupta.

In 2019, she made her Telugu debut with action-thriller film Chanakya, which received mixed reviews from critics and performed poorly at the box office. The same year, she appeared in Punjabi film Daaka alongside Gippy Grewal, which also received mixed reviews.

Khan will next star in film Hum Bhi Akele Tum Bhi Akele with Anshuman Jha, which revolves around a unique love story about two homosexuals and is scheduled to release in 2020.

Filmography

Films

Television

Music videos

Awards

See also
 List of Indian film actresses

References

External links

 
 

1987 births
Living people
Indian film actresses
Actresses in Hindi cinema
Actresses from Mumbai
Female models from Mumbai
Indian people of Pashtun descent
Actresses in Tamil cinema
Actresses in Punjabi cinema
21st-century Indian actresses